Charles Ogle (1893-1959) was an Australian rugby league footballer who played in the 1910s and 1920s.

Playing career
Ogle played for Glebe for five seasons between 1917 and 1922. Ogle played wing in the 1922 Grand Final against North Sydney which Glebe lost 35–3 at the Sydney Cricket Ground. He represented New South Wales on one occasion in 1919.
Ogle took up a player-coach role with Manilla in 1923, with the town's team competing against Tamworth teams.

Death
He died at his Leichhardt, New South Wales home on 22 February 1959, aged 65.

References

Glebe rugby league players
Australian rugby league players
1959 deaths
New South Wales rugby league team players
1893 births
Rugby league wingers
Date of birth missing
People from Tamworth, New South Wales
Rugby league players from New South Wales